In linear algebra, the Gram matrix (or Gramian matrix, Gramian) of a set of vectors  in an inner product space is the Hermitian matrix of inner products, whose entries are given by the inner product .

An important application is to compute linear independence: a set of vectors are linearly independent if and only if the Gram determinant (the determinant of the Gram matrix) is non-zero.

It is named after Jørgen Pedersen Gram.

Examples

Given square-integrable functions  on the interval , the Gram matrix  is:

 

The matrix will be symmetric if the bilinear form  is symmetric.

Applications
 In Riemannian geometry, given an embedded -dimensional Riemannian manifold  and a parametrization  for  the volume form  on  induced by the embedding may be computed using the Gramian of the coordinate tangent vectors:  This generalizes the classical surface integral of a parametrized surface  for : 
 If the vectors are centered random variables, the Gramian is approximately proportional to the covariance matrix, with the scaling determined by the number of elements in the vector.
 In quantum chemistry, the Gram matrix of a set of basis vectors is the overlap matrix.
 In control theory (or more generally systems theory), the controllability Gramian and observability Gramian determine properties of a linear system.
 Gramian matrices arise in covariance structure model fitting (see e.g., Jamshidian and Bentler, 1993, Applied Psychological Measurement, Volume 18, pp. 79–94).
 In the finite element method, the Gram matrix arises from approximating a function from a finite dimensional space; the Gram matrix entries are then the inner products of the basis functions of the finite dimensional subspace.
 In machine learning, kernel functions are often represented as Gram matrices. (Also see kernel PCA)
 Since the Gram matrix over the reals is a symmetric matrix, it is diagonalizable and its eigenvalues are non-negative. The diagonalization of the Gram matrix is the singular value decomposition.

Properties

Positive-semidefiniteness
The Gram matrix is symmetric in the case the real product is real-valued; it is Hermitian in the general, complex case by definition of an inner product.

The Gram matrix is positive semidefinite, and every positive semidefinite matrix is the Gramian matrix for some set of vectors. The fact that the Gramian matrix is positive-semidefinite can be seen from the following simple derivation:
 

The first equality follows from the definition of matrix multiplication, the second and third from the bi-linearity of the inner-product, and the last from the positive definiteness of the inner product.
Note that this also shows that the Gramian matrix is positive definite if and only if the vectors  are linearly independent (that is,  for all ).

Finding a vector realization

Given any positive semidefinite matrix , one can decompose it as:
 ,

Then
 

Thus a Hermitian matrix  is positive semidefinite if and only if it is the Gram matrix of some vectors . Such vectors are called a vector realization of  The infinite-dimensional analog of this statement is Mercer's theorem.

Uniqueness of vector realizations

This is the only way in which two real vector realizations of  can differ: the vectors  are unique up to orthogonal transformations.

The same holds in the complex case, with unitary transformations in place of orthogonal ones.

Other properties
 Because , it is necessarily the case that  and  commute.  That is, a real or complex Gram matrix  is also a normal matrix.
 The Gram matrix of any orthonormal basis is the identity matrix.  Equivalently, the Gram matrix of the rows or the columns of a real rotation matrix is the identity matrix.  Likewise, the Gram matrix of the rows or columns of a unitary matrix is the identity matrix.

Gram determinant
The Gram determinant or Gramian is the determinant of the Gram matrix:

If  are vectors in  then it is the square of the n-dimensional volume of the parallelotope formed by the vectors. In particular, the vectors are linearly independent if and only if the parallelotope has nonzero n-dimensional volume, if and only if Gram determinant is nonzero, if and only if the Gram matrix is nonsingular. When  the determinant and volume are zero. When , this reduces to the standard theorem that the absolute value of the determinant of n n-dimensional vectors is the n-dimensional volume.

The Gram determinant can also be expressed in terms of the exterior product of vectors by

When the vectors  are defined from the positions of points  relative to some reference point ,

then the Gram determinant can be written as the difference of two Gram determinants,

where each  is the corresponding point  supplemented with the coordinate value of 1 for an -st dimension. Note that in the common case that , the second term on the right-hand side will be zero.

Constructing an orthonormal basis

Given a set of linearly independent vectors  with Gram matrix , one can construct an orthonormal basis

The inverse  of positive definite matrix G is unique and also positive definite and thus has a unique positive definite square root . One can check that these new vectors are orthonormal:

See also
 Controllability Gramian
 Observability Gramian

References

External links
 
 Volumes of parallelograms by Frank Jones

Systems theory
Matrices
Determinants
Analytic geometry
Kernel methods for machine learning